

Events
26 August — Matieu de Caersi composed a planh ("Tant suy marritz que no.m puese alegrar") on the death of James I of Aragon and so did Cerverí de Girona ("Si per tristor, per dol no per cossir")
Guiraut Riquier composes the pastorela D'Astarac venia.
 Death of Guido Guinizelli (born 1230), Italian poet and 'founder' of the Dolce Stil Novo

Births

Deaths
 Guido Guinizelli (born 1230), Italian poet and 'founder' of the Dolce Stil Novo

13th-century poetry
Poetry